Henry Cowles (April 24, 1803 – September 7, 1881) was an American theological scholar and abolitionist.

Personal life 
Cowles, son of Olive Phelps and Samuel Cowles, was born in Norfolk, Conn., April 24, 1803.

He was married, July 30, 1830, to Alice Welch, daughter of Benjamin Welch, M.D., of Norfolk, Connecticut, who died October 14, 1843. They had three sons and three daughters, of whom one son (Oberlin College, 1856) and one daughter survived him. In March 1844, he married Minerva Dayton, daughter of William Dayton, of Watertown, and widow of Anson Penfield, of Oberlin, who died November 29, 1880. He became the stepfather of Josephine Penfield Cushman Bateham, social reformer, editor, and writer.

Of September 7, 1881, at the age of 78, Cowles died of ataxia while at his daughter's home in Janesville, Wisconsin.

Education 
Cowles graduated from Yale College in 1826.

After two years of study in the Yale Divinity School, he was ordained, with a view to home-missionary work, at Hartford, Conn., July 1, 1828.

Cowles went to Ohio, and after laboring about two years in Ashtabula and Sandusky, took charge of the Congregational Church in Austinburg, where he remained until the fall of 1835, when he became Professor of Latin and Greek in Oberlin College. In 1838 he was transferred to the chair of Ecclesiastical History, and in 1840 to that of Hebrew, in the Theological Department, in which he continued until 1848, at that time he became the editor of the Oberlin Evangelist, which he conducted until 1863. For the rest of his life he remained in Oberlin, engaged in literary labor. During the fourteen years from 1867 he published sixteen volumes of Commentaries, covering the whole Scriptures, and devoted the profits arising from them to the missionary cause. 

He received the degree of Doctor of Divinity from Hillsdale College, Michigan, in 1863.

External links

 Oberlin bio

1803 births
1881 deaths
American abolitionists
People from Norfolk, Connecticut
Yale Divinity School alumni
American Congregationalist ministers
Congregationalist abolitionists
Oberlin College faculty
American religious writers
Yale College alumni
19th-century American clergy